St Peter's College (including its predecessor school St Peter's School), a secondary school in Auckland, New Zealand, has employed many notable faculty and staff.

Approximately ninety Christian Brothers were associated with St Peter's College from 1939 until 2007.

Notable staff and patrons 

 John Acklandhistory teacher and  taught in the commerce faculty; rugby league player in the Kiwis in 1983
 Jim Anderton   (1938 – 2018) politician, Deputy Prime Minister in the Fifth Labour Government (1999-2002); taught in the intermediate (the middle school) at St Peters in 1959 and 1960
 Ken Arvidson (1938–2011) poet and academic; taught senior English at St Peter's College 1960-1963, Notably, he taught poets Sam Hunt and Terry Locke
 Bro Dominic Fursey Bodkin  (1843-1929) - established Christian Brothers in NZ; eponym of Bodkin House at St Peter's. 
 John Logan Campbell (1817-1912) - donor of the Pitt St site of St Peter's School.
 Mike Chunn  (born 1952)  founding member of Split Enz; taught at St Peter's College in 1977
 Reginald Delargey (1914 – 1979), Archbishop and cardinal - St Peter's College school chaplain for 18 years (1940s-1950s).
 Patrick Dignan (1814 – 1894) Member of Parliament, and member of the Board of Governors of St Peter's School
 Felix Donnelly  (1929 – 2019), priest, social activist, writer, academic and radio talkback host - school chaplain in 1960s.
 Paul Farmer, priest, monsignor - chaplain of St Peter's College in the 1970s and currently (as at 2021).
 Kieran Fouhy long-serving Headmaster of St Peter's College, 1989-2015
 Ken Gorbey  (born 1942) -  Museum designer: of Te Papa and the Jewish Museum Berlin; taught Geography to senior classes at St Peter's in 1967.

 Bro Michael Benignus Hanrahan  - Provincial of the Christian Brothers; provided Christian Brothers to staff St Peter's in 1939.
 Grant Hansen - Deputy Headmaster (2016 -); Rugby union coach of the Black Ferns 2009.
 Bro Vincent Michael Innocent Jury  (1933 - 2023) B.Sc (Hons) (in pure and applied mathematics) (Sydney); M.Sc(?) (Otago?)(1962); BA (1970); Dip.Ed: old boy of St Peter's College; taught at St Peter's College 1967-1974; Principal of two secondary schools (St Thomas of Canterbury College and Trinity Catholic College, Dunedin); pastoral worker and community adult education administrator and teacher (also established a community radio station and a youth centre), Christian Brothers outreach, the Edmund Rice Community, in Murupara, Bay of Plenty (1992-2008). 
 Pat LamAll Black, loose forward (1992), teacher at St Peter's College (1991–1992)
 Peter Leonarda teacher at St Peter's School in the 1870s and 1880s and went on to teach at other early schools in Auckland
 Archbishop James Liston  (1881 – 1976) 7th Roman Catholic Bishop of Auckland - founder and funder of St Peter's College.

 Kevin Malloyadvertising chief executive, member St Peter's College Board of Trustees in 2015
 Bro Thomas Monagle  (1928-1983) - founder of the St Peter's College railway station in 1964.
 Bro Francis Pius O'Driscoll (died 1964) - foundation headmaster of St Peter's College (1939-1944).
 Richard James O'Sullivan (1826–1889) a teacher at St Peter's School and a school inspector
 Isa Outhwaite (1842 – 1925) - watercolour artist, poet social activist and philanthropist - donor of the St Peter's College site and first funder of the college.
 Archbishop Giovanni Panico, Apostolic Delegate, ruled that Bishop Liston could invite the Christian Brothers to staff St Peter's College.
 Edmund Powellclasses were first held in Powell's residence in Shortland Crescent on 27 September 1841
 Nicholas Reid (born 1951) poet; historian; book and film reviewer; was a philosophy and theology teacher at St Peter's, and also taught public speaking and debating 2008-2018
 Bro Patrick Celestine Ryan (1909-1996) - Headmaster of St Peter's 1957-1965; creator of The Cage.
 Pio Terei  (born 1958) - actor, singer and comedian on New Zealand television - as at 2010 he was a member (representing parents) on the St Peter's College Board of Trustees
 Bro Patrick Ambrose Treacy  (1834-1912) - established Christian Brothers in Australia; eponym of Treacy House at St Peter's. 
 Bro Peter Watt a teacher at St Peter's 1969-1972; 1980; and 1986-2016; cricket coach and eponym of Watty's Nets.
 Tom Weal (1929 – 2016)teacher at St Peter's College (1954-1957, 1959-1989); also a New Zealand politician for the Social Credit Party, the New Democratic Party and the short lived Christian Democrat party
 Bro Lawrence Wilkes  at the school over 40 years until mid-1990s; Technical Drawing specialist; he introduced Young Christian Students (YCS) programmes in the college and commenced the college's service programme.

See also

 Congregation of Christian Brothers in New Zealand
 List of people educated at St Peter's College, Auckland

References

Bibliography 
No author; sorted by publication name
 NZ Catholic : the national Catholic newspaper, 1996–present.
 
 St Peter's College Magazines, St Peter's College, Auckland, 1948-2015.
 Zealandia, 1939-1990.

by author

External links
 st-peters.school.nz

St Peter's College, Auckland
Saint Peter's College, Auckland
St Peter's College, Auckland faculty